Kashmir Beats is a Pakistani television music show which features live studio-recorded music performances by established actors of the industry. The show is another of its kind in Pakistan by Kashmir Cooking Oil. The show is different with regard to its featuring of actors as singers in the season.The Idea of this show was initiated by Haris Qadeer who has also Directed the show Shany Haider produced the music for the show and it debuted with its first episode on-airing on 8 January 2021.

Artists 
The season 1 show features performances from the established actors of the industry including Faysal Qureshi, Adnan Siddiqui, Hira Mani, Zara Noor Abbas, Asad Siddiqui, Imran Abbas, Ahsan Khan, Asma Abbas, Kinza Hashmi, Faryal Mehmood, Zhalay Sarhadi and Zubab Rana.

The season 2 show features performances from the established actors of the industry including tba].

See also 

 Music of Pakistan
 Pepsi Battle of the Bands
 Coke Studio
 Nescafé Basement
 Velo Sound Station
 Bisconni Music
 Uth Records
 Acoustic Station

References

External links 
 Kashmir Beats on YouTube

Pakistani music television series
2021 in Pakistani television
Pop music television series